The 2020–21 Louisville Cardinals men's basketball team represented the University of Louisville during the 2020–21 NCAA Division I men's basketball season. The team played its home games on Denny Crum Court at the KFC Yum! Center in downtown Louisville, Kentucky as members of the Atlantic Coast Conference. They were led by third-year head coach Chris Mack.

In a season limited due to the ongoing COVID-19 pandemic, the Cardinals finished the season 13–7, 8–5 to finish in seventh place in ACC play. They lost to Duke in the second round of the ACC tournament. They were listed as an alternate team for the NCAA tournament if a team were unable to participate due to COVID-19 issues. The team declined an invitation to the NIT prior to the NCAA Tournament field being announced. When all teams were able to participate in the opening rounds of the NCAA tournament, the Cardinals season ended.

Previous season
The Cardinals finished the 2019–20 season with of 24–7, 15–5 to finish in a tie for second place in ACC play. As the No. 3 seed in the ACC tournament, they were scheduled to play Syracuse before the tournament was canceled due to the COVID-19 pandemic.  The NCAA tournament was later also canceled due to the pandemic.

Offseason

Departures

Incoming transfers

2020 recruiting class

Roster

Schedule and results

|-
!colspan=12 style=| Regular season

|-
!colspan=12 style=| ACC tournament

Source

Rankings

*AP does not release post-NCAA Tournament rankings

References

Louisville Cardinals men's basketball seasons
Louisville
Louisville Cardinals men's basketball, 2020-21
Louisville Cardinals men's basketball, 2020-21